Julian Guthrie is an American journalist and author based in San Francisco, California, USA.

Career
Guthrie started her journalism career at the San Francisco Examiner, and after its merger, continued at the San Francisco Chronicle. She published her first book, The Grace of Everyday Saints, in 2011, about a church's closure order. It was based on work she had done as metro reporter covering the church's drama in 2005. In 2013, she published her second book, The Billionaire and the Mechanic, which was updated to include the Oracle Team second win at the America's Cup in its 2014 second edition. Its second edition landed on the New York Times bestsellers list. In 2014, her third book was preemptively sold to Penguin Books. That book was originally entitled "Beyond: Peter Diamandis and the Adventure of Space", before becoming How to Make a Spaceship. In 2016, her third book, How to Make a Spaceship, was published. This book enticed several offers to acquire the film rights. It landed on the New York Times bestsellers list, and became a finalist in the 2017 PEN/Wilson Literary Science Writing Award, and won the 2016 Emme Astronautical Literature Award. Her fourth book, Alpha Girls, bought up by Currency Books in 2017 for 2019 publication, incited a bidding war in 2017 for its film and TV rights, ending up at Welle Entertainment.

Publications
The Grace of Everyday SaintsCovers the battle of a Roman Catholic congregation to keep their neighborhood church open despite the command by the Church hierarchy to close 'St. Brigid's Church' down.
The Billionaire and the MechanicCovers the origins of Team Oracle USA, with founder Larry Ellison, and its quest to win the America's Cup, and through its second edition, the second win of the America's Cup. Angus Phillip's review in The Wall Street Journal said of the book that "She (the author) clearly had exceptional access to the generally media-shy billionaire and provides detailed descriptions of Mr. Ellison's living spaces, work habits, tennis pals like Rafael Nadal and Jimmy Connors, best friend and neighbor Steve Jobs, his many airplanes, cars, boats and houses, his clothing tastes, even his food preferences. She paints a picture of a modern contrarian who delights in bucking convention, which is how he wound up at Golden Gate."
How to Make a SpaceshipCovers the origin of the X Prize, its funding woes, the teams that entered the competition, major figures related to the contest, the winning team with SpaceShipOne, and the follow-up of Virgin Galactic scooping up the winning tech. Gregg Easterbrook's review in The Wall Street Journal said of the book that "'How to Make a Spaceship' offers a rousing anthem to the urge to explore."
Alpha GirlsCovers the unsung women heroes of Silicon Valley and the computer industry.

Bibliography

Awards and honors
 New York Times – Sports Literature – Best Sellers – July 2014 – for 2014 book "The Billionaire and the Mechanic" (announced July 2014)
 New York Times – Science Literature – Best Sellers – November 2016 – for 2016 book "How to Make a Spaceship" (announced November 2016)
 Finalist — 2017 PEN/E. O. Wilson Literary Science Writing Award — for 2016 book "How to Make a Spaceship" (announced January 2017)
 Winner — 2016 Eugene M. Emme Astronautical Literature Award — for 2016 book "How to Make a Spaceship" (announced September 2017)

See also
 Ashlee Vance, another journalist who also covered a computing billionaire, and also the NewSpace sector.

References

Further reading
 San Francisco Chronicle, Julian Guthrie – Features Reporter
 Sail Magazine, Julian Guthrie
 Huffington Post, Julian Guthrie
 Good Reads, Julian Guthrie

External links
 Official website: http://www.julianguthriesf.com/
 
 
 C-SPAN, "Julian Guthrie discusses 'How to Make a Spaceship', Museum of Flight (October 17, 2016)

Living people
American women non-fiction writers
American women journalists
American newspaper reporters and correspondents
San Francisco Chronicle people
21st-century American non-fiction writers
21st-century American women writers
Year of birth missing (living people)